Hailu Negussie (born April 16, 1978) is a marathon runner who was the winner of the 109th Boston Marathon in 2005. He finished with a time of 2:11:45 and became the first Ethiopian to win the Boston Marathon since Abebe Mekonnen won the race in 1989. His personal best for the marathon is 2:08:16.

Negussie tried to defend his Boston title in 2006. However, he dropped out of the race just past the halfway point. Kenyan Robert Kipkoech Cheruiyot broke the course record that year. Negussie has also won the Hofu Marathon in 2002 (with a personal best time of 2:08:16) and the Xiamen Marathon (with a time of 2:09:03) in 2003. He also finished 5th in the 2003 Fukuoka Marathon and 2nd in the 2002 Hamburg Marathon.

Achievements

See also
List of winners of the Boston Marathon

External links
Toby Tanser, Hailu Negussie
marathoninfo

Ethiopian male long-distance runners
1978 births
Living people
Athletes (track and field) at the 2004 Summer Olympics
Olympic athletes of Ethiopia
Boston Marathon male winners
Ethiopian male marathon runners
20th-century Ethiopian people
21st-century Ethiopian people